Gadolinium(III) nitrate is an inorganic compound of gadolinium. This salt is used as a water-soluble neutron poison in nuclear reactors. Gadolinium nitrate, like all nitrate salts, is an oxidizing agent.

The most common form of this substance is hexahydrate Gd(NO3)3•6H2O with molecular weight 451.36 g/mol and CAS Number: 19598-90-4.

Use 
Gadolinium nitrate was used at the Savannah River Site heavy water nuclear reactors and had to be separated from the heavy water for storage or reuse.
The Canadian CANDU reactor, a pressurized heavy water reactor, also uses gadolinium nitrate as a water-soluble neutron poison in heavy water.

Gadolinium nitrate is also used as a raw material in the production of other gadolinium compounds, for production of specialty glasses and ceramics and as a phosphor.

References 

Gadolinium compounds
Nitrates
Neutron poisons